A caffeine patch is a type of a transdermal patch designed to deliver caffeine to the body through the skin. The concept is similar to that of a nicotine patch.

References 

Transdermal patches
Caffeine